Outrigger canoeing at the 2011 Pacific Games in Nouméa, New Caledonia was held on August 29–September 3, 2011.

Medal summary

Medal table

Men

Women

References

Canoeing at the 2011 Pacific Games

Outrigger canoeing at the Pacific Games
2011 Pacific Games
Pacific Games